Wilbur Cross High School is a four-year public high school in the East Rock neighborhood of New Haven, Connecticut, United States, serving ninth through twelfth grades. The school is named after Connecticut Governor Wilbur Lucius Cross and is the largest school in the New Haven Public Schools in the number of students as well as teachers. The school operates with two semesters and four marking periods.

History
The school was founded in 1920 as Commercial High School, taking over the vocational education components that had been included in Hillhouse High School. Commercial became a comprehensive school in 1949 and was renamed in memory of Governor Cross in 1950.

In 1960 (1961?) Wilbur Cross and Hillhouse High School were both constructed using identical layouts, save one elevation change between wings. Cross had red external panels, while Hillhouse was blue. There were 3 different offerings: College Prep, Business, and General. There were only 3 grades. In 1963, the first graduating class that started there had 444 members, out of roughly 700 that had started as sophomores. There were roughly 2,000 students.

Academics
Wilbur Cross has four career-themed "academies": Business & Fine Arts, Health & Culinary Sciences, Law & Public Service, and the International Academy of Digital Arts & Sciences. 

Wilbur Cross High School offers 15 Advanced Placement (AP) Classes. Students are required to take the exams. The exam fee is covered by the school district.

Athletics
Wilbur Cross's mascot is the Governor, in recognition of the school's namesake. They compete in the Oronoque Division of the Southern Connecticut Conference. These sports are offered:

Fall 
Football
Boys' Soccer
Girls' Soccer
Girls' Volleyball
Boys' Cross Country
Girls' Cross Country
Boys' Swimming
Girls' Swimming (combined with East Haven)
Cheerleading

Winter 
Boys' Basketball
Girls' Basketball
Boys' Indoor Track
Girls' Indoor Track

Spring 
Baseball
Softball
Lacrosse
Coed Tennis
Golf
Boys' Outdoor Track
Girls' Outdoor Track

Basketball 
The school has a long history on the basketball court. At one time, Cross teams were regular participants in the New England Tournament, an event of up to 15,000 spectators at the Boston Garden. However, Connecticut withdrew from the tournament after a riot in 1958 during the tournament final between Wilbur Cross and a Somerville, Massachusetts team. New Haven high schools were successful in the Connecticut high school basketball leagues through the 1960s. Cross High School and nearby rival Hillhouse High School won the state championship in nine of ten years of the decade. 

One of the stars of the late 1960s teams, John "Super John" Williamson, averaged nearly 40 points per game for the Governors in 1970 and went to play college ball at New Mexico State University and star as a pro in the American Basketball Association. 

In the 1973–1974 season The Washington Post ranked Cross the No. 1 high school team in the nation and a headline in the New York Post proclaimed Cross "The Best High School Team in the World" after the Governors defeated New York City's DeWitt Clinton High School team. The 1999-2000 team was considered the state's best, with a 24–0 record, until being upset by Bridgeport Central High School in the quarterfinals of the state tournament. The 2007-2008 team had an undefeated regular season, going 20–0. The Governors won the division, the SCC tournament, and the BABC Holiday Classic, but lost to Lyman Hall by three points in the quarter-finals of the state tournament.

Other sports 
The boys' soccer team won its division and advanced to the final 16 of the state championship in 2007. The boys' indoor track team finished second in Connecticut, also in the 2007-2008 year.

The football team plays Hillhouse High School every year on Thanksgiving in the Elm City Bowl in an annual game that dates back to 1920.

Notable alumni

 Ben Allison (born 1966), jazz bassist and composer
 Lauren Ambrose (born 1978), actress and singer
 Troy Bradford (born 1966, class of 1985), All-American basketball player at Fairfield University
 Bob Clifford (c. 1913–2006), football player and coach, who served as the head football coach at Colby College and at the University of Vermont
 Lubbie Harper Jr. (class of 1961), Connecticut Supreme Court judge
 Casimir Loxsom (born 1991), Olympic 800m specialist
 Dom Perno, former basketball coach at the University of Connecticut
 Richard Proto (class of 1958), cryptographer elected to the United States National Security Agency Hall of Honor
 John Williamson (born 1951, class of 1970), basketball player in the American Basketball Association, 1973–1981

References

External links

 
 New Haven School District website

1920 establishments in Connecticut
Educational institutions established in 1920
Schools in New Haven, Connecticut
Public high schools in Connecticut